Victim Number 8 is a Spanish conspiracy thriller television series created by Sara Antuña and Marc Cistaré that originally aired on ETB 2 and Telemadrid from October 10 to November 28, 2018. It stars César Mateo, María de Nati, and Verónika Moral.

Premise 
Loosely inspired on the August 2017 Barcelona attacks, the plot revolves around a jihadi bombing in the Old Town of Bilbao with seven casualties and several more wounded, and the police investigation trying to catch those responsible for the killing.

Cast

Several EITB and Telemadrid journalists make cameo appearances as themselves.

Production and release 
It was co-produced by Mediapro (via its production companies K2000 and Globomedia), ETB and Telemadrid.  Alejandro Bazzano was the director of the series.

Victim Number 8 premiered in Spain on October 10, 2018, simultaneously on ETB 2 and Telemadrid. The series was released worldwide on Netflix on August 16, 2019.

Episodes

Reception

Victim Number 8 has a rating of 3.5 stars out of 5 on the review website Ready, Steady, Cut. Writing for Ready Steady Cut, Jonathan Wilson commented: “Tense and engrossing, this Spanish thriller offers a well-paced and tightly-written high-stakes story.”

References

External links
 
 

2010s Spanish drama television series
Spanish-language television shows
2018 Spanish television series debuts
Television shows set in Biscay
Islamic terrorism in fiction
Spanish television series about terrorism
Telemadrid original programming
Television series by Globomedia